Comophyllia is an extinct genus of prehistoric stony corals in the family Latomeandridae. Species are known from the Jurassic and Cretaceous. C. elegans, the type species, is from the Jurassic of France.

See also 
 List of prehistoric hexacoral genera

References 

 d'Orbigny (A.), 1850 - Prodrome de Paléontologie stratigraphique universelle des animaux mollusques et rayonnés, vol. 2, p. 1-427

External links 

 Fossil specimen MNHN.F.A09634 at Muséum national d’Histoire naturelle, Paris (France), Collection: Paleontology (F)

Prehistoric Hexacorallia genera
Scleractinia genera
Mesozoic animals of Europe
Mesozoic invertebrates